This is a list of calculus topics.

Limits
 Limit (mathematics)
 Limit of a function
 One-sided limit
 Limit of a sequence
 Indeterminate form

 Orders of approximation
 (ε, δ)-definition of limit
Continuous function

Differential calculus
 Derivative
 Notation
 Newton's notation for differentiation
 Leibniz's notation for differentiation
 Simplest rules
 Derivative of a constant
 Sum rule in differentiation
 Constant factor rule in differentiation
 Linearity of differentiation
 Power rule
 Chain rule
 Local linearization
 Product rule
 Quotient rule
 Inverse functions and differentiation
 Implicit differentiation
 Stationary point
 Maxima and minima
 First derivative test
 Second derivative test
 Extreme value theorem
 Differential equation
 Differential operator
 Newton's method
 Taylor's theorem
 L'Hôpital's rule
 General Leibniz rule
 Mean value theorem
 Logarithmic derivative
 Differential (calculus)
 Related rates
 Regiomontanus' angle maximization problem

 Rolle's theorem

Integral calculus
 Antiderivative/Indefinite integral
 Simplest rules
 Sum rule in integration
 Constant factor rule in integration
 Linearity of integration
 Arbitrary constant of integration
 Cavalieri's quadrature formula
 Fundamental theorem of calculus
 Integration by parts
 Inverse chain rule method
 Integration by substitution
 Tangent half-angle substitution

 Differentiation under the integral sign
 Trigonometric substitution
 Partial fractions in integration
 Quadratic integral
 Proof that 22/7 exceeds π
 Trapezium rule
 Integral of the secant function
 Integral of secant cubed
 Arclength
Solid of revolution
 Shell integration

Special functions and numbers
 Natural logarithm
 e (mathematical constant)
 Exponential function
 Hyperbolic angle
 Hyperbolic function
 Stirling's approximation
 Bernoulli numbers

Absolute numerical
See also list of numerical analysis topics
 Rectangle method
 Trapezoidal rule
 Simpson's rule
 Newton–Cotes formulas
 Gaussian quadrature

Lists and tables
 Table of common limits
 Table of derivatives
 Table of integrals
 Table of mathematical symbols
 List of integrals
 List of integrals of rational functions
 List of integrals of irrational functions
 List of integrals of trigonometric functions
 List of integrals of inverse trigonometric functions
 List of integrals of hyperbolic functions
 List of integrals of exponential functions
 List of integrals of logarithmic functions
 List of integrals of area functions

Multivariable
 Partial derivative
 Disk integration
 Gabriel's horn
 Jacobian matrix
 Hessian matrix
 Curvature
 Green's theorem
 Divergence theorem
 Stokes' theorem

Series
 Infinite series
 Maclaurin series, Taylor series
 Fourier series
 Euler–Maclaurin formula

History
 Adequality
 Infinitesimal
 Archimedes' use of infinitesimals
 Gottfried Leibniz
 Isaac Newton
 Method of Fluxions
 Infinitesimal calculus
 Brook Taylor
 Colin Maclaurin
 Leonhard Euler
 Gauss
 Joseph Fourier
 Law of continuity
 History of calculus
 Generality of algebra

Nonstandard calculus
 Elementary Calculus: An Infinitesimal Approach
 Nonstandard calculus
 Infinitesimal
 Archimedes' use of infinitesimals

For further developments: see list of real analysis topics, list of complex analysis topics, list of multivariable calculus topics.

Calculus

Calculus